Musical Mornings with Coo is an American animated television series produced by Cartoon Pizza and PBS Kids Sprout Originals. The block first aired on September 26, 2007 and ended on August 21, 2009.

Hosts
Coo (performed by Julianne Buescher), a sky blue cuckoo bird who loves to sing a lot and hopes viewers would have a good day and puts lessons into her songs.

Guest hosts and other characters
Elizabeth portrayed by Elizabeth Balzano, is the singer and guitarist for the children's show, Bounce!
Ballou is a CGI character and Elizabeth's sidekick for Bounce.

Show schedule

 Angelina Ballerina
 Bob the Builder 
 Thomas & Friends
 Bounce
 Caillou (now on Cartoonito)
 Fireman Sam 
 Make Way for Noddy
 Sesame Street (now on PBS Kids and Cartoonito)
 Jay Jay the Jet Plane (now on Smile)
 Pingu

Replacement
After August 21, 2009, Musical Mornings with Coo was discontinued. On August 24, 2009, the block was replaced by Sprout's Wiggly Waffle.

Television programming blocks in the United States
2007 American television series debuts
2009 American television series endings
Universal Kids original programming